The Addiction Research Center (ARC) is a center of addiction research that was founded in 1935. It was originally based in Lexington, Kentucky, United States, housed on the rural campus of the US Public Health Service Hospital. The ARC shared the campus with the Federal Bureau of Prisons; subjects ("volunteers") for the human experimental research  were drawn from a pool of felons convicted of drug charges. Dr Harris Isbell was the Director of Research from 1945 until 1963. The ARC became part of the National Institute on Drug Abuse in 1974. The ARC clinical research unit and basic science unit were relocated to Baltimore, Maryland in 1979 and 1984, respectively.

Research at the ARC is well-documented in two books published in 1978, both of which are available on-line: a book of conference proceedings, and an annotated bibliography.

References

External links
Addiction Research Center on NIH.gov

Addiction organizations in the United States
Lysergic acid diethylamide
Human subject research in the United States
Mental health organizations in Maryland